Friedelinde Petershofen (born 19 August 1995) is a German pole vaulter. She competed in the women's pole vault at the 2017 World Championships in Athletics.

References

External links

1995 births
Living people
German female pole vaulters
World Athletics Championships athletes for Germany
Place of birth missing (living people)